Wawpecong is an unincorporated community in Clay Township, Miami County, in the U.S. state of Indiana.

History
Wawpecong (historically spelled Waupecong) was platted in 1849. Wawpecong is a name derived from the Miami-Illinois language meaning "shell-bark hickories". A post office was established at Wawpecong in 1849, and remained in operation until 1907.

References

Unincorporated communities in Miami County, Indiana
Unincorporated communities in Indiana